Chinnagottigallu is a village in Tirupati district of the Indian state of Andhra Pradesh. It is the mandal headquarters of Chinnagottigallu mandal.

References 

Villages in Tirupati district
Mandal headquarters in Tirupati district